M. Asli Dukan (born 1973) is an American independent media producer, filmmaker and visual artist based in Philadelphia working with themes of speculative fiction and Afrofuturism.

Early life
M. Asli Dukan was born in Newark, New Jersey and grew up in Harlem, New York. Dukan credits her family and childhood for influencing her focus on black consciousness and science fiction.

Education
M. Asli Dukan has a Media and Communication Arts MFA from the City University of New York (CUNY) awarded in 1999 and a film production BA from New Jersey City University in 1997. Filmmaker Ayoka Chenzira was one of her professors.

Career
Dukan is a lecturer at the University of Pennsylvania. She has also taught at the University of the Arts and the City College of New York.

Dukan says she "embraces the futuristic, fantastic and imaginary genres of speculative fiction (SF) as a way to explore the possibilities of social transformation in society." She has written, produced and directed several short SF films that have screened in film festivals across the country, the Newark International Film Festival, the ImageNation Film and Music Festival, the Langston Hughes Film Festival and the Blackstar Film Festival. She has contributed to a scholarly edited volume about Afrofuturism and its trends in multiple media.  She founded Mizan Media Productions, a multimedia company that centers Afro-diasporic fiction and non-fiction narratives, in 2000. Through her production company she has directed and produced short speculative fiction films, as well as videos for indie artists and arts organizations.

The “Resistance Time Portal,” her mixed-media, augmented-reality installation centered on Black radicalism in a futuristic narrative, made its debut in the Distance≠Time exhibition at the Icebox Project Space, a contemporary arts and culture venue in Philadelphia.

In 2018 Dukan was a judge for the Glyph Comic Awards.

Filmography
 Sleeping on a train in Motion (Short) (1999)
 Orishas (Short) (2001)
 Boot (Music video) (2006)
 Do You Mind (Music video) (2008)
 73 (Short) (2008)
M.O.M.M (Short) (2011)
Resistance: the Battle of Philadelphia (Prologue) (Short) (2017)
 Resistance: the Battle of Philadelphia (Web series) (2018)
Memories from the Future (Short) (2019)
Invisible Universe (Expected) (2020)

Awards and honors
Urban Artist Initiative Grant, 2009
Kitchen Table Giving Circle Grant, 2012
Leeway Foundation – Art and Change Grant, 2014
The City University of New York Fellowship, 2014
Leeway Foundation – Art and Change Grant, 2016
Black Public Media, NBPC 360 Fellow, 2016, Mentor: Arthur Jafa
Leeway Foundation – Transformation Award, 2016
Scribe/Philadelphia Independent Media Finishing Fund, 2018
 The Flaherty Seminar – Philadelphia Foundation Fellow, 2018

References

External links

IMDB listing

1973 births
Living people
American filmmakers
University of Pennsylvania faculty
African-American academics
African-American film directors
Artists from Pennsylvania
African-American women artists
American speculative fiction artists
Artists from Newark, New Jersey
People from Harlem
City University of New York alumni
New Jersey City University alumni
Afrofuturists
American women academics
21st-century African-American people
21st-century African-American women
20th-century African-American people
20th-century African-American women